Thornborough Bridge is located on the original Bletchley and Buckingham road, now bypassed by a modern bridge in 1974 for the A421. The bridge is accessible to walkers from an adjacent lay-by.

The bridge straddles the parish boundaries of Thornborough and Buckingham (the parish boundary follows the line of Padbury Brook or The Twins, a tributary of the River Great Ouse), and dates from the end of the 14th century and is the only surviving mediaeval bridge in Buckinghamshire. The parish division is marked by a boundary stone in the middle of the bridge.

The bridge is Grade I listed by English Heritage.

References

External links

Bridges in Buckinghamshire
Grade I listed buildings in Buckinghamshire
Scheduled monuments in Buckinghamshire